USS M-1 (SS-47) was a unique submarine of the United States Navy. M-1 was designed as a test bed for the newest technology in submarine construction and design. As well as being the world's first double-hulled design (in contrast to Simon Lake's and Holland's single-hulled concepts), her battery was of a new design and was to have solved some of the past flaws. While no other M-class submarines were built, the lessons learned were incorporated into the following .

Design
M-1 was built with the same armament and range as the preceding L class, but larger due to the double hull design. This was to reduce the risk of battle damage puncturing the pressure hull, and to provide additional reserve buoyancy in the event of flooding. The partially retractable /23 caliber deck gun designed for submarines and intended for incorporation in the L class was installed on M-1 prior to installation on any of the L class.

Service history
Her keel was laid down on 2 July 1914 by Fore River Shipbuilding Company in Quincy, Massachusetts, as a subcontractor to the Electric Boat Company of Groton, Connecticut, the designer. She was launched on 14 September 1915 sponsored by Ms. Sara Dean Roberts, and commissioned on 16 February 1918.

Following commissioning, M-1 was assigned to Submarine Division 2 (SubDiv2), and was homeported at Newport, Rhode Island. Unlike most other US submarines, she was not deployed overseas in World War I. For the next three years, she operated off the East Coast, training submariners. During her last year of active service, she was under the operational control of SubDiv 5 and SubDiv 3.

After four years of testing and training service, M-1 was decommissioned at Philadelphia Naval Shipyard on 15 March 1922, struck from the Naval Vessel Register the following day, and was sold for scrap on 25 September to Joseph G. Hitner in Philadelphia, Pennsylvania.

References

Notes

Sources
 Gardiner, Robert and Gray, Randal, Conway's All the World's Fighting Ships 1906–1921 Conway Maritime Press, 1985. .
 Friedman, Norman, US Submarines through 1945: An Illustrated Design History, Annapolis: Naval Institute Press, 1995, .
 Navsource.org early diesel submarines page
 Pigboats.com M-boat page
 DiGiulian, Tony Navweaps.com 3"/23 caliber gun

External links

 

 

Submarines of the United States Navy
Ships built in Quincy, Massachusetts
1915 ships
World War I submarines of the United States